Dennis D. Donovan (January 31, 1859 – April 21, 1941) was a U.S. Representative from Ohio.

Born near Texas, Ohio, Donovan attended the common schools, and Northern Indiana Normal School, Valparaiso, Indiana.
He taught school.
He engaged in the mercantile and timber business. He studied law at Valparaiso University School of Law.
He was graduated from the law department of Georgetown University, Washington, D.C., in 1895.
He was admitted to the bar the same year and commenced practice in Deshler, Ohio.
He was appointed postmaster of Deshler by President Cleveland on July 21, 1885, and served until January 27, 1888.
He was mayor of Deshler for two terms.
He served as member of the State house of representatives in 1887 and 1889.

Donovan was elected as a Democrat to the Fifty-second and Fifty-third Congresses (March 4, 1891 – March 3, 1895).
He was an unsuccessful candidate for renomination in 1894 to the Fifty-fourth Congress.
He resumed the practice of law in Deshler, Ohio.
He moved to Napoleon, Ohio, in 1897 and continued the practice of law.
He was an unsuccessful candidate for nomination as Governor of Ohio in 1898.
He died in Napoleon, Ohio, on April 21, 1941.
He was interred in St. Augustine Cemetery.

He married Ginevra Waltimire of Deshler, Ohio in 1891. He was a member of B.P.O.E. and Knights of Columbus.

Ginevra outlived him, dying on July 1, 1974 at the age of 110.

Sources

1859 births
1941 deaths
Georgetown University Law Center alumni
People from Henry County, Ohio
Democratic Party members of the Ohio House of Representatives
Ohio lawyers
Mayors of places in Ohio
Valparaiso University alumni
People from Napoleon, Ohio
People from Deshler, Ohio
Democratic Party members of the United States House of Representatives from Ohio